Rabbits is a pseudo-documentary podcast from producer and writer Terry Miles. In the show, narrator Carly Parker searches for her missing friend Yumiko "Miko" Takata and finds herself in the midst of a decades-old alternate reality game known as Rabbits or simply "The Game." A main feature of Rabbits is the use of pop culture references, especially to classic video games like Defender and Space Ace.

A second season was announced and its funding was attempted on Kickstarter, but it did not reach its goal. It was released on Stitcher Premium on 2021. In the second season new narrator Riley Bennet investigates the world of "The Game." 

A three episode spin-off mini-series The Path was available on Apple in 2021.

A novel set in the Rabbits universe and written by Miles was released on June 8, 2021. A sequel, The Quiet Room is due to be published in October 2023.

Episodes

Season 1

Season 2  
(Available on Stitcher)

The Path 
(Available on Apple)

Reception 
Time listed Rabbits as one of "The 50 Best Podcasts Right Now," saying it is perfect for "people nostalgic for that moment when we couldn't tell if The Blair Witch Project was real or not." USA Today chose Rabbits as their "Podcast Pick" of the week because part of its fun is that "it feels like it almost could be true." Vox chose Rabbits for a list of "podcasts to get you in the Halloween spirit" because of its "well-acted blend of urban legends, weird fiction, and your average creepypasta." Neil Patrick Harris called Rabbits "addictive."

Wil Williams criticized Rabbits for its writing, acting, and production, along with the other Pacific Northwest Stories podcasts Tanis and The Black Tapes, as well as its pacing and advertising ("How am I, the listener, supposed to feel suspense or concern in an intense plot moment when the host stops her narration to talk about Nature Box?"). Lucia Peters criticized the first episode's writing for relying too heavily on exposition.

Novel 
In 2021, a Rabbits novel written by Terry Miles was released.  The novel tells a new story set in the same world as the podcast.

References

External links 
 

2017 podcast debuts
Podcasts adapted for other media
Audio podcasts 
Horror podcasts
Scripted podcasts